Radio24 may refer to:

 Radio24 (Malaysia), the only 24-hour news and talk radio station in Malaysia
 Radio 24 (Italy), the Italian private all-news radio, owned by the newspaper Il Sole 24 Ore